Palabras del Silencio (English: Words from the Silence) is the seventh studio album, and sixth in Spanish recorded by Puerto Rican singer-songwriter Luis Fonsi. The album was released by Universal Music Latino on 26 August 2008 (see 2008 in music). The album debuted at No. 15 on Billboard 200 Album Charts selling about 30,000 in the first week. The album was certified Platinum for shipping 200,000 units in the United States. It was also certified Gold in Mexico and Argentina, Platinum in Spain and 4× Platinum in Venezuela. This album received a Grammy Award for Best Latin Pop Album nomination at the 51st Annual Grammy Awards on 8 February 2009, losing to La Vida... Es Un Ratico by Juanes.

An expanded Anniversary Edition, Palabras del Silencio: Un Año Después, was released on 8 September 2009, expanded to a 2-disc CD+DVD set, including on the CD the original 13 tracks plus an additional 5 tracks.

Track listing

Charts

Sales and certifications

Awards and nominations

2009 Latin Billboard Music Awards

Premio Lo Nuestro 2009

2009 Grammy Awards

2009 Premios Juventud

|-
|rowspan="12"| 2009 || "No Me Doy por Vencido" || La Mas Pegajosa (Most Addictive Song) || 
|-
|| "No Me Doy Por Vencido" || Cancion Corta-Venas (Best Ballad) || 
|-
|| "No Me Doy Por Vencido" || Mi Ringtone (My Ringtone) || 
|-
|| Aquí Estoy Yo || La Combinacion Perfecta (Best Collaboration)  Shared With: Aleks Syntek, David Bisbal & Noel Scharjis || 
|-
|| Aquí Estoy Yo ||Mi Video Favorito (My Favorite Video)  Shared With: Aleks Syntek, David Bisbal & Noel Scharjis || 
|-
|| "Luis Fonsi" || Voz del Momento (Artist of the Year) || 
|-
|| "Luis Fonsi" || Mi Artista Pop (Favorite Pop Artist) || 
|-
|| "Luis Fonsi" || Mi Idolo Es (My Idol Is) || 
|-
|| "Luis Fonsi" ||Torridos Romances (Favorite Love Birds)  Shared With: Adamari López || 
|-
|| "Luis Fonsi" || El De Mejor Estilo (Best Dressed) || 
|-
|| "Luis Fonsi" || Esta Buenisimo! (Hottest Male) || 
|-
|| "Palabras del Silencio" || Me Muero Sin Ese CD (Best Album) || 
|-

Palabras del Silencio: Un Año Después
Palabras del Silencio: Un Año Después was released 8 September 2009. The album contained live tracks as well previously unreleased remixes of "No Me Doy Por Vencido" and "Aquí Estoy Yo."

Track listing
Palabras del Silencio: Un Año Después (©2009)
Disc 1 – CD
 "Quién Le Va A Decir" – 3:48
 "Llueve Por Dentro" – 3:59
 "Otro Día Será (Desencontrándonos)" – 3:14
 "No Me Doy por Vencido" – 3:58
 "Aunque Estés Con Él" – 4:38
 "La Mentira" – 3:37
 "Lágrimas del Mar" – 4:16
 "Todo Vuelve A Empezar" (duet with Laura Pausini) – 4:13
 "Persiguiendo El Paraíso" – 3:37
 "Todo Lo Que Tengo" – 3:30
 "Aquí Estoy Yo" (feat. Aleks Syntek, Noel Schajris and David Bisbal) – 4:11
 "Tienes Razón" – 4:22
 "No Me Doy Por Vencido (Ranchera Version)" – 3:55
 "Así Debe Ser" – 3:34
 "No Me Doy Por Vencido" (Urbana Version) (feat. MJ) – 2:56
 "No Me Doy Por Vencido" (Banda Version) (feat. German Montero) – 3:52
 "Aquí Estoy Yo" (Solo Version) – 4:07
 "Llueve Por Dentro" (Live) (2009 Live from San Juan, Puerto Rico) – 4:53

Disc 2 – DVD
 "Aquí Estoy Yo" (feat. Aleks Syntek, Noel Schajris, and David Bisbal) [Music Video]
 "No Me Doy Por Vencido" (Live from Coliseo de Puerto Rico, José Miguel Agrelot Coliseum)
 "Llueve Por Dentro" (Live from Coliseo de Puerto Rico, José Miguel Agrelot Coliseum)
 "Aquí Estoy Yo" (feat. Aleks Syntek, Noel Schajris, and David Bisbal) [Live from Coliseo de Puerto Rico, José Miguel Agrelot Coliseum]

References

2008 albums
Luis Fonsi albums
Universal Music Latino albums
Albums produced by Sebastian Krys
Spanish-language albums